A Little Frog Is looking for His Father is a 1964 Soviet stop-motion animated film by Roman Kachanov, produced by the Soyuzmultfilm studio.

Plot summary
The Little Frog is looking for, but can not find a dad, who can protect him and play with him. He runs into various animals and asks them to become his dad. All these animals are larger than The Little Frog, and those animals did not want to become the frog's dad. But suddenly, The Little Frog sees a little grasshopper crying, who also has no father. So, The Little Frog says to The Little Grasshopper, "Do not cry. I'll be Your Dad...".

Creators

External links

A Little Frog Is looking for His Father (en) at Animator.ru
The Film at The Russian Movie base (rus) at Kinopoisk.ru

Soviet animated films
1964 films
Russian animated films
Soyuzmultfilm
Films directed by Roman Abelevich Kachanov
Soviet animated short films